The 2002 Georgia Tech Yellow Jackets football team represented the Georgia Institute of Technology in the 2002 NCAA Division I-A football season. The team's coach was Chan Gailey, the former head coach of the NFL's Dallas Cowboys from 1998-1999. It played its home games at Bobby Dodd Stadium in Atlanta.

Schedule

Roster

References

Georgia Tech
Georgia Tech Yellow Jackets football seasons
Georgia Tech Yellow Jackets football